Central Frontenac is a township in eastern Ontario, Canada in the County of Frontenac.

Central Frontenac was created in 1998 through an amalgamation of the Townships of Hinchinbrooke, Kennebec, Olden and Oso.

Communities
There are 28 communities:

 Arden
 Ardendale
 Bordenwood
 Burke Settlement
 Clarendon Station  
 Cole Lake
 Crow Lake
 Echo
 Elm Tree
 Godfrey
 Henderson
 Kirk Cove  
 Long Lake  
 McLean  
 Mountain Grove  
 Oak Flats 
 Oconto  
 Oso  
Parham
 Piccadilly  
 Ronaldson  
 Seouls Corners  
Sharbot Lake
Tichborne
 Wagarville  
 Wilkinson  
 Zealand

Demographics 

According to the 2006 Statistics Canada Census:
Mother tongue:
 English as first language: 93.1%
 French as first language: 1.2%
 English and French as first language: 0.2%
 Other as first language: 5.5%

Transportation
The main road is Highway 7 which runs through the entire township from east to west. Central Frontenac Road 38 intersects Highway 7 at Sharbot Lake and runs south to South Frontenac Township, providing connectivity with Kingston.

The route of the former Kingston and Pembroke Railway runs through the township, and has been converted into the K&P Rail Trail.

Crime
On June 7, 2020, a gunman opened fire on his neighbours after lighting building on fire which spread to the adjacent historic century old St. James Anglican church destroying both buildings in Parham. One person was injured. The man was charged with attempted murder, arson and firearms-related charges.

Education 
Central Frontenac, along with South Frontenac, North Frontenac and the Frontenac Islands, send students to schools part of the Limestone District School Board, based in neighboring Kingston.

See also
List of townships in Ontario

References

External links

Township municipalities in Ontario
Lower-tier municipalities in Ontario
Municipalities in Frontenac County